Antherothamnus is a genus of flowering plants belonging to the family Scrophulariaceae.

Its native range is Zimbabwe to Southern Africa.

Species:

Antherothamnus pearsonii

References

Scrophulariaceae
Scrophulariaceae genera
Taxa named by N. E. Brown